Back into the Future is the seventh album by the Welsh rock band Man. Released in September 1973, it was the first Man album recorded following the departure of Clive John. Back into the Future was originally issued as a double LP. LP 1 was recorded at Rockfield Studios, Chipping Norton Recording Studios, and Olympic Studios in London between May and July 1973, initially by the remaining four band members, but they felt an additional guitarist was needed, so Wild Turkey guitarist Alan "Tweke" Lewis joined for the final studio recordings. Lewis also played on LP 2, which was recorded live by Pye Mobile at The Roundhouse in London on 24 June 1973.

The album spent three weeks in the UK album chart, peaking at No 23, the highest album chart position of any Man album.

Track listing

Personnel

Side one 
 Michael "Micky" Jones – guitar, vocals
 Phil Ryan – keyboards, vocals
 Will Youatt – bass, vocals
 Terry Williams – drums, vocals

Side two, three & four 
 Michael "Micky" Jones – guitar, vocals
 Alan "Tweke" Lewis – guitar
 Phil Ryan – keyboards, vocals
 Will Youatt – bass, vocals
 Terry Williams – drums, vocals

Credits 
 Engineering – Anthony Matthews
 Front photography – Ruan O'Laughran
 Art direction and photography inside – Pierre Tubbs

References

External links 
 Man - Back into the Future (1973) album review by Paul Collins, credits & releases at AllMusic.com
 Man - Back into the Future (1973) album releases & credits at Discogs.com
 Man - Back into the Future (1973) album credits & user reviews at ProgArchives.com
 Man - Back into the Future (1973) album to be listened as stream at Spotify.com

Albums produced by Vic Maile
1973 live albums
Man (band) live albums
United Artists Records live albums
Albums recorded at Rockfield Studios